Mike Stephens is a British television producer and director, most famous for his role as producer and director of shows such as 'Allo 'Allo! and The Brittas Empire. He also produced and directed both series of the short lived series, First of the Summer Wine.

Notes

British television directors
British television producers
Living people
Year of birth missing (living people)